Tristram is a variant of Tristan. A Welsh given name, it originates from the Brythonic name Drust or Drustanus. It derives from a stem meaning "noise", seen in the modern Welsh noun  (plural ) and the verb  "to clatter". The name has also been interpreted as meaning "bold."

This version of the name was popularised after the 1759 publication of Laurence Sterne's novel The Life and Opinions of Tristram Shandy, Gentleman.

People with the name
Sir Tristram Beresford, 1st Baronet (died 1673), Irish Member of Parliament
Sir Tristram Beresford, 3rd Baronet (1669–1701), Irish Member of Parliament, grandson of the above
Tristram Benjamin Bethea (1810–1876), American lawyer and politician
Tristram Cary (1925–2008), British-Australian pioneering electronic music composer
Tristram Coffin (disambiguation)
Tristram Conyers (1619–1684), English lawyer and politician
H. Tristram Engelhardt Jr. (1941–2018), American philosopher
Tristram Hillier (1905–1983), English painter
Tristram Hunt (born 1974), British politician, historian and journalist
Tristram Kennedy (1805–1885), Irish politician and lawyer
Tristram Shapeero (born 1966), British television director
Tris Speaker (1888–1958), American Hall-of-Fame baseball player
Tristram Speedy (1836–1911), English explorer and adventurer
Tristram Stuart (born), English activist and author
Tristram Tyrwhitt (c. 1530–1590), English Member of Parliament
Tristram Welman (1849–1931), English amateur cricketer

Surname
 David Tristram (born 1957), English comic playwright
 Ernest William Tristram (1882–1952), British art historian, artist and conservator
 Henry Baker Tristram (1822–1906), English clergyman and ornithologist
 John William Tristram (1870–1938), Australian painter
 Katharine Tristram (1858–1948), English Anglican missionary and teacher in Japan
 Ruth Mary Tristram (1886-1950), British amateur botanist

Masculine given names